A national liberation skirt  or national celebration skirt is a style of skirt, handmade of patchwork and embroidery, in celebration of Dutch Liberation Day on 5 May 1945. The style was invented by resistance fighter and feminist Mies Boissevain-van Lennep. The  has been described as "a female mode of political expression ... [which] explicitly linked gender to the reconstruction of a ravaged country and the general striving for 'breakthrough' and social renewal."

History
Boissevain-van Lennep had been imprisoned in 1943 for her involvement with the Dutch resistance to the Nazi occupation of the Netherlands during World War II. Soon after, a scarf was smuggled into her cell that had been constructed of textile patches of personal significance—including a piece of her first ballgown and pieces from her children's clothing. As a member of a post-war women's committee intending to celebrate the rebuilding of the Netherlands and inspired by her memory of that scarf, she devised a skirt to represent "unity in diversity"; "new from old"; "building from the broken" and "one garment makes unity"."

Concept
The idea was that these unique skirts would be worn during national holidays and similar events as a symbol of both individuality and national unity. In the words of a song composed in honour of the idea: "Weave the pattern of your life into your skirt" (. Through handmade patchwork, the skirts also literally symbolised the concept of postwar reconstruction. 

 To ensure that all  were handmade, the International Archives for the Women's Movement was assigned responsibility for registering and numbering each skirt. More than 4,000 received official registration.

Use and legacy
Her preferred nickname was "levensrok" (skirt of life) while others in the Netherlands used "bevrijdingsrok" (liberation skirt) or "oranjerok" (orange skirt, referring to the House of Orange, the reigning Dutch royal family). Each had one or more triangles sewn near the front hem on which the date of the Dutch Liberation Day, 5 May 1945, was embroidered; some also had the dates of later celebrations in which the makers participated. Prominent among the colours in these  were the Dutch national colours: red, white, blue, and orange. The skirts were individually registered in a national archive under the names of their makers, and their identification number was often embroidered into the skirt itself.

On 2 September 1948, some 1500 women wearing  took part in a parade in Amsterdam marking the Golden Jubilee of Queen Wilhelmina's coronation and coinciding with the exhibition .

Some of these skirts are now in the collections of museums, including the Rijksmuseum, the National Liberation Museum, and the Textile Research Centre in Leiden. The Verzetsmuseum (Resistance Museum) in Amsterdam holds Mies Boissevain-van Lennep's own .

See also 
Folk costume
Netherlands in World War II

References

External links 
Aggregated search results for "Nationale feestrok" from several cultural heritage organisations on Europeana.

Skirts 
Dutch clothing
Textile arts
1940s in the Netherlands
Aftermath of World War II in the Netherlands
Embroidery